Eulenbis is a municipality (German: Ortsgemeinde) in the district of Kaiserslautern, in Rhineland-Palatinate, Germany.

Geography 
Eulenbis lies around 13 kilometers northwest of Kaiserslautern. The Eulenkopf to the west has a height of 422 meters, and Eulenbis is the highest part of the greater Weilerbach community.

Additionally, the hamlets of Mückenmühle and Untere Pfeifermühle belong to Eulenbis.

History 
The first documented mention of the town as "Ulengebeiß" dates back to the year 1380.

Politics

Town Council 
The Eulenbis town council consists of eight members who were last elected on May 26, 2019. Previously made up of 12 members, the council is headed up by a volunteer mayor.

Mayor 
The mayor of Eulenbis is Kathleen Hielscher. She was selected by direct election on May 26, 2019 and received 56.97 % of ballots cast. She is the successor to Ulrich Stemler (Free Voters), who did not run for re-election.

Coat of Arms 
Emblazoning: "In gold on arched green ground a gold-plated black owl." German: "In Gold auf gewölbtem grünem Boden eine goldbewehrte schwarze Eule."

Culture and Notable Sights

Buildings 
The Eulenkopfturm (English: "Eulenkopf Tower") has long been known as the symbol of the community and is visible for kilometers thanks to its prominent location above the town. Originally designed as a watch tower, construction on the ca. 19 meter tall tower began on August 24, 1913 and the building was dedicated on 1914. A local society, the Eulenkopfverein, has maintained the building since its construction till the present. It has been renovated twice: from 1951-1952 and 1991-1992. In addition to the 12.2 meter-high viewing platform that offers visitors sweeping views of the Palatinate Forest towards the southeast, the tower's ground floor houses the highest Standesamt in the Palatinate.

Economy and Infrastructure 

The nearest motorway is the Bundesautobahn 6.

References 

 Gerold Scheuermann: Eulenbis. (Hrsg.: Ortsgemeinde Eulenbis), Ortsgemeinde Eulenbis, Eulenbis 1985

External links 

 Official Website of the Ortsgemeinde Eulenbis

Municipalities in Rhineland-Palatinate
Kaiserslautern (district)